was a town located in Higashiusuki District, Miyazaki Prefecture, Japan.

As of 2003, the town had an estimated population of 4,477 and the density of 43.24 persons per km2. The total area was 103.53 km2.

On February 20, 2006, Kitaura, along with the town of Kitakata (also from Higashiusuki District), was merged into the expanded city of Nobeoka.

External links
Official website of Nobeoka

Dissolved municipalities of Miyazaki Prefecture